Punchbowl Cirque is a cirque in the southern part of Shipton Ridge, about 0.5 nautical miles (0.9 km) southwest of Roscolyn Tor, in the Allan Hills of Oates Land. It was reconnoitered by the New Zealand Antarctic Research Program (NZARP) Allan Hills Expedition (1964), which gave the descriptive name.

Cirques of Antarctica
Landforms of Oates Land